The Widow in Scarlet (also known as Lady Raffles) is a 1932 American pre-Code mystery crime film directed by George B. Seitz and starring Dorothy Revier, Kenneth Harlan and Lloyd Whitlock . It was distributed by the independent Mayfair Pictures.

Synopsis
Baroness Orsani makes a bet that she can steal a friend's valuable diamond necklace jus to prove that she can, intending to return it afterwards. Before she can accomplish this, a gang of international jewel thieves led by a man posing as a police inspector, steal it first.

Cast
 Dorothy Revier as Baroness Orsani
 Kenneth Harlan as Peter Lawton-Bond
 Lloyd Whitlock as Mandel
 Glenn Tryon as Spuffy
 Myrtle Stedman as Alice Lawton-Bond
 Lloyd Ingraham as Bradley
 Harry Strang as Hymie
 Hal Price as Eddie
 Arthur Millett as Hanson
 Phillips Smalley as Peter's pal
 Wilfrid North as Peter's pal

References

Bibliography
 Pitts, Michael R. Poverty Row Studios, 1929–1940: An Illustrated History of 55 Independent Film Companies, with a Filmography for Each. McFarland & Company, 2005.

External links

1932 films
1932 crime films
American crime films
Films directed by George B. Seitz
American black-and-white films
Mayfair Pictures films
1930s American films
1932 mystery films
American mystery films